Dixie is a nickname for the southeastern United States.

Dixie may also refer to:

Places

United States 
 Dixie, Brooks County, Georgia, an unincorporated community
 Dixie, Newton County, Georgia, an unincorporated community
 Dixie, Elmore County, Idaho, an unincorporated community
 Dixie, Idaho County, Idaho, an unincorporated community
 Dixie, Indiana, an unincorporated community
 Dixie, Henderson County, Kentucky, an unincorporated community
 Dixie, Whitley County, Kentucky, an unincorporated community
 Dixie, Louisiana, an unincorporated community
 Dixie, Missouri, an unincorporated community
 Dixie, Oregon (disambiguation), multiple locations
 Dixie, Fluvanna County, Virginia, an unincorporated community
 Dixie, Mathews County, Virginia, an unincorporated community
 Dixie, Washington, a census-designated place
 Dixie, Harrison County, West Virginia, an unincorporated community
 Dixie, Nicholas County, West Virginia, an unincorporated community
 Dixie County, Florida
 Dixie Creek, a tributary of Red Clover and Indian Creek, California
 Dixie Hills, Nevada, a mountain range
 Dixie Mountain, a peak near Frenchman Lake, California
 Dixie Valley, a basin in Nevada
 Dixie (Utah), a nickname for the southwestern region of Utah

Elsewhere 
 Dixie, Queensland, Australia
 Dixie, Mississauga, Ontario, Canada, a neighbourhood

Arts and entertainment 
 Dixie, a character in Pixie and Dixie and Mr. Jinks
 Dixie, a character in the 1987 American buddy cop action movie Lethal Weapon
 "Dixie" (song), a well-known song born of the American minstrel tradition
 Dixie (album), album by Avail
 Dixie (film), a Bing Crosby musical
 Dixie (Pee-wee's Playhouse), a taxi-cab driver character
 Dixie Kong, a character from the Donkey Kong series
 Dixie (board wargame), an alternate-history game by SPI
 Dixie (card game), a card game produced by Columbia Games, Inc.

Education 
 Dixie Grammar School, Market Bosworth, Leicestershire, England
 Dixie Hollins High School, St. Petersburg, Florida, U.S.
 Dixie School District, California, U.S.
 Dixie Technical College, St. George, Utah, U.S.
 Tennessee Technological University (or University of Dixie), Cookeville, Tennessee, U.S.
 Utah Tech University (formerly Dixie State University), St. George, Utah, U.S.

Transportation 
 Dixie GO Station, a GO Transit railway station in Mississauga, Ontario, Canada
 Dixie Highway, a former highway between Chicago and Miami
 Dixie Overland Highway, an American auto trail
 Dixie station (MiWay), a bus station in Mississauga, Ontario, Canada
 Dixie USFS Airport, a public-use U.S. Forest Service airport near Dixie, Idaho County, Idaho
 New Zealand DX class locomotive or Dixie, a series of diesel-electric locomotives
 Dixie, the private railroad car of Henry H. Rogers, builder of the Virginian Railway

Maritime vessels 
 USS Dixie (1893), an auxiliary cruiser and later a destroyer tender
 Dixie-class destroyer tender, a World War II ship class
 USS Dixie (AD-14), lead ship of the class
 USS Dixie III (SP-701), a patrol boat
 Dixie (sternwheeler)

Sports 
 Dixie Athletic Conference, a short-lived high school conference in southern Indiana
 Dixie Bowl, a college football bowl game held following the 1947 and 1948 seasons
 Dixie Conference, three collegiate athletic leagues in the United States
 Dixie League (disambiguation), several American minor league baseball leagues
 Dixie Motor Speedway, a racetrack near Birch Run, Michigan
 Dixie Stakes, a horse race at Pimlico Race Course

Other uses 
 Dixie (name), a list of people and characters with the given name, nickname or surname
 Dixie baronets, a title in the Baronetage of England from 1660 to 1975
 DIXIE, an obsolete protocol for accessing X.500 directory services
 Dixie Brewing Company, a New Orleans-based brewery that produces Dixie Beer
 Dixie Cap, a nickname for the American variant of the sailor cap 
 Dixie Center for the Arts, a venue in Ruston, Louisiana
 Dixie Cup, a brand name of disposable paper cups
 Dixie Fire, a 2021 wildfire in California
 Dixie High School (disambiguation)
 Dixie Travel Plaza or Dixie Truck Stop, McLean, Illinois
 Operation Dixie, a post-World War II campaign to unionize industry in the southern United States

See also 
 Dixi (disambiguation)
 Dixieland (disambiguation)
 DIXY, a Russian grocery chain
 Dixy Chicken, a Pakistani halal fast-food chain